The  Rheinisches Malermuseum is an art museum in Bonn, Germany. The museum is owned by a private association and has exhibits on forgotten artistic techniques and tools of the painter. It was established in 1985.

References
This article was initially translated from the German Wikipedia.

Art museums and galleries in Germany
Museums in Bonn
Art museums established in 1985
Rhineland
1985 establishments in West Germany